Carabus wiedemanni is a species of beetle from family Carabidae, found in Bulgaria, Greece, European part of Turkey, and Near East.

References

wiedemanni
Beetles described in 1836
Beetles of Asia
Beetles of Europe